La Roque-Esclapon is a commune in the Var department in the Provence-Alpes-Côte d'Azur region in southeastern France. It had a population of 256 in 2019.

See also
Communes of the Var department

References

Communes of Var (department)